Postcard from a Painted Lady is a studio album by Kikki Danielsson, released on 25 September 2015.

Professional reviews
Aftonbladets Håkan Steen gave the album three stars out of five possible.

Track listing

Contributors
Kikki Danielsson - vocals
Stefan Bellnäs - bass, dobro, doublebass
Johan Håkansson - drums, percussion
Gunnar Frick - piano, organ, pedal steel, guitar, accordion
Pär Öjerot - guitar, mandolin, banjo, mandola
Henrik Cederblom - violin
Sören Karlsson - producer

Charts

References

2015 albums
Kikki Danielsson albums